Christopher Wolfgang Georg August Schindler (born 29 April 1990) is a German professional footballer who plays as a centre-back for 2. Bundesliga club 1. FC Nürnberg. After beginning his career with 1860 Munich, he moved to English club Huddersfield Town in 2016, with whom he secured promotion to the Premier League. He joined Nürnberg in 2021 and has also played for Germany's U21s.

Club career
Schindler began his career with his hometown team, TSV 1860 Munich. He was named captain of the team after Julian Weigl was suspended to the second squad and fined for disciplinary reasons early in the 2014–15 season.

After making over 200 appearances for 1860 Munich's first and second teams, Schindler joined English Championship club Huddersfield Town on 29 June 2016. He signed a three-year contract, with Huddersfield paying an undisclosed then-club record fee, reported to be around £1.8 million. Schindler joined Chris Löwe, Michael Hefele, Martin Cranie and Mark Hudson as former captains at the club. He made his debut for the Terriers in a 2–1 Championship win over Brentford on 6 August 2016, the opening game of the season. Schindler scored his first goal for the club, a header, in a 1–0 win over Ipswich Town on 1 October 2016.

On 29 May 2017, Schindler scored the winning penalty in the 2017 Championship play-off Final in a penalty shootout against Reading, which promoted Huddersfield Town to the Premier League. He signed a new three-year contract with the club on 24 July 2017, with the option of an additional year, after making 48 appearances in the 2016–17 season.

On 10 August 2018, Schindler signed another new contract, keeping him at the club until the summer of 2021, with the option of a further year. He had played all but one game of the Terriers' games in the 2017–18 season, in which Huddersfield secured Premier League survival. Head coach David Wagner commented that "he took to the Premier League as if he had played in it all his life".

He won the club's player of the year award in 2017–18 and 2018–19, becoming the first back-to-back winner of the award since Peter Clarke in 2011.

On 11 May 2021, it was announced that Schindler would be leaving Huddersfield Town at the end of his contract, after five years at the club. The club's chairman Phil Hodgkinson said that "he will always be considered among the greats at Huddersfield Town". 1. FC Nürnberg reported his signing the same day, on a free transfer.

International career
Schindler is a former youth international, having played four games for the Germany national under-21 football team in 2011 and 2012.

Career statistics

Honours
Huddersfield Town
EFL Championship play-offs: 2017

References

External links

Christopher Schindler at tsv1860.de 

1990 births
Living people
Footballers from Munich
German footballers
Germany under-21 international footballers
Association football defenders
TSV 1860 Munich players
TSV 1860 Munich II players
Huddersfield Town A.F.C. players
1. FC Nürnberg players
Regionalliga players
2. Bundesliga players
English Football League players
Premier League players
German expatriate footballers
Expatriate footballers in England
German expatriate sportspeople in England